Noah Boeken (born 6 January 1981) is a Dutch professional poker and Magic: The Gathering player.

Magic: The Gathering career
At first, Boeken began playing Magic: The Gathering with some kids at his school but quickly discovered that he could win against people who had been playing for years and began to play professionally. 

Some of Boeken's notable results include:
 1997 Pro Tour Chicago - 15th place
 Pro Tour Mainz - 32nd place
 GP Copenhagen - 3rd place
 2000 European Championship - Champion - $11,500

After his early success in his Magic: The Gathering career, he started playing poker.

Poker career

Early career
Boeken's first major finish in the money was at the 2003 Master Classics of Poker, where he finished 4th in the €200 no-limit hold'em event. Eight months later, he played in the $10,000 no-limit hold'em championship of Festa al Lago II in Las Vegas, Nevada where he won.

European Poker Tour
In October 2004, Boeken made the final table of the European Poker Tour (EPT) event in London won by professional John Shipley. Boeken made a second EPT final table in January 2005 at the Scandinavian Open in Copenhagen where he defeated professional and Hendon Mob member Ram Vaswani in the final heads-up confrontation. Boeken has cashed six times at the EPT and made two final tables.

World Series of Poker
Boeken attended the World Series of Poker (WSOP) in 2005 and cashed twice, including at the final table of the $2,500 limit hold'em event. He finished 96th out of 6,494 total entries in the Main Event at the 2009 World Series of Poker.

British Poker Open
Boeken won the 2006 British Poker Open beating a strong field, which included Gus Hansen, and collecting 50,000 GBP.

Poker winnings
As of 2011, Boeken's total live tournament winnings exceed $1,200,000.

Other poker ventures
Boeken plays online poker as an Exclusive at PokerStars and Full Tilt Poker. Until the start of February 2012, he was a member of the Team PokerStars group of sponsored players.

In 2007, Boeken and professional player Marcel Lüske started a television show called Veronica Poker where they taught famous Dutch people how to play poker with the winner invited to an important tournament in Las Vegas. A second television show, Poker Kings NL, aired on the Tien channel in February 2007, and follows both Boeken and Lüske while they travel the world attending poker tournaments.

Notes

External links
Column written by Boeken
Pokerlistings.com profile
Gutshot.com interview
Wizards.com profile and interview
Magicthegathering.com Article and Interview
Boeken Online Stats on Macropoker

1981 births
Dutch poker players
European Poker Tour winners
Living people
Dutch Magic: The Gathering players
Sportspeople from Amsterdam